Edward Dujardin (29 November 1817, Antwerp - 21 May 1889, Antwerp) was a Belgian painter and art teacher.

Biography 
He began his studies at the Royal Academy of Fine Arts (Antwerp), under Gustaf Wappers. From 1841, he taught figure drawing and placement at the Academy, a position he held until his death. He also authored two works on the subject: "Distribution, legs and movements of the human body, as taught in the Royal Academy of Antwerp" (1871), and "The proportions or measures of comparison of the most special antique statues and Greek statues of women, with four plates" (1888). His notable students included Henri Bource, Frans Mortelmans, Edward Portielje and Gerard Portielje. 

He painted historical events, Biblical scenes, and portraits, and was in great demand for decorating public celebrations. The novelist, Hendrik Conscience, was a good friend of his and he provided illustrations for several of his works, including The Lion of Flanders.

He was married to Theresia Maria Van Arendonck; sister of the sculptor, . They had two daughters. Their daughter Alida married the architect, Jules Bilmeyer.

Flemish nationalism 
Unlike many of his colleagues at the Academy, he supported Flemish nationalism and was a board member of "Voor Tael en Kunst", an organization that promoted cultural and entertainment activities. During the early 1850s, they became associated with Catholicism and disbanded. 

In 1855, he was one of the co-founders of the magazine De Vlaemsche School, which served as a successor to "Voor Tael en Kunst". From 1872 to 1876, and again from 1884 to 1888, he represented the party in the Antwerp Provincial Council.

Sources 
"Edouard DUJARDIN, illustrator Hendrik Conscience" by E. H. G. Van Cauwenberghe @ Academia; a detailed biography. 
 J.F. Buyck, Catalogus schilderijen 19de en 20ste eeuw, Koninklijk Museum voor Schone Kunsten Antwerpen, Antwerp, 1977.

External links 

 More works by Dujardin @ Arcadja

1817 births
1889 deaths
Belgian painters
Belgian history painters
Belgian portrait painters
Flemish nationalists
Artists from Antwerp